Elvis Presley (1935–1977) was an American singer and actor.

Elvis may also refer to:

Name
 Elvis (name), a given name and a list of people with the name

Music
 Elvis Radio, a station on Sirius Satellite Radio
 Elvis (1956 album), a studio album by Elvis Presley
 Elvis (1968 album), a live album by Elvis Presley
 Elvis (1973 album), a studio album also called The Fool by Elvis Presley 
 Elvis: A Legendary Performer Volume 1
 Elvis: A Legendary Performer Volume 2
 Elvis: A Legendary Performer Volume 3
 Elvis: A Legendary Performer Volume 4
 Elvis: Greatest Hits Volume 1 
 Elvis (musical), a 1977 West End musical
 "Elvis" (song), a song by Leki & the Sweet Mints from Elvis
 "Elvis", a 1993 song by Intaferon
 "Elvis", a 1996 song by Longpigs
 "Elvis", a 2006 song by These New Puritans
 "Elvis", a 2012 song by AOA

Film and television
 Elvis (1968 TV program) or The 68 Comeback Special
 Elvis: That's the Way It Is, a 1970 documentary
 Elvis (1979 film), a television film
 Elvis (1990 TV series)
 Elvis (miniseries), a 2005 CBS miniseries
 Joanna Lumley: Elvis and Me, a 2015 documentary
 Elvis  (2022 film), a biopic by Baz Luhrmann

Other uses
 Elvis: What Happened?, a 1977 biography of Presley by Steve Dunleavy
 Elvis (comic strip), a Swedish comic strip
 Elvis (helicopter)
 Elvis (text editor)
 Elvis impersonator
 Elvis operator, a type of conditional operator in programming
 17059 Elvis, an asteroid
 Elvis Rock, in Powys, Wales
 Memphis Summer Storm of 2003 or Hurricane Elvis
 Tropical Storm Elvis
 Elvis, a codename for the Nokia Lumia 1020 smartphone

See also
 Alvis (disambiguation)
 Disappearance of Heather Elvis, American woman who disappeared in 2013
 Elvis taxon
 Saint Elvis (disambiguation)